Vinit Rai Chamling (born 10 October 1997) is an Indian professional footballer who plays as a central midfielder for Indian Super League club Mumbai City, on loan from Odisha and the India national team.

Club career
Born in Duliajan, Assam, Rai was scouted by the Duliajan Football Academy and later by the Tata Football Academy at the age of 13 and trained there for four years. After graduating from Tata, Rai signed with I-League side Dempo. On signing Rai, Dempo head coach at the time, Arthur Papas said "Vinit is a very cultured midfielder with a great range of passing. He has a willingness to always want the ball and link the play between the defensive and forward lines." Rai would enter the 2014–15 season with Dempo as the youngest first-team player. After spending a majority of the season playing for the club's youth team, Rai made his professional debut for Dempo in the league on 1 March 2015 against East Bengal. He came on as an 81st-minute substitute for Jewel Raja as Dempo lost 5–1.

Kerala Blasters
After helping Dempo regain promotion to the I-League, Rai signed with Indian Super League side Kerala Blasters on 6 September 2016. He made his debut for the team on 1 October 2016 against NorthEast United. He started the match and played 76 minutes as Kerala Blasters fell 1–0.

Minerva Punjab
After the ISL 2016 season, Vinit Rai signed with Minerva FC and will make its debut in I-league this season.

Odisha FC
Rai joined Odisha FC for the 2019–20 ISL season as a midfielder. He also captained the team.

Loan to Mumbai City
In 2022, Rai was loaned out to Indian Super League defending champions Mumbai City from Odisha. He was later included in club's 2022 AFC Champions League squad.

International
Rai made his debut for the India under-23 side on 27 March 2015 against Uzbekistan U23 in the 2016 AFC U23 Championship qualifiers. He played 80 minutes as India U23 fell 2–0. Almost a year later, Rai made his debut on the bench for the India senior side in their FIFA World Cup qualifier against Iran. He did not come off the bench though. Rai, however, did make his unofficial debut for India in the team's unofficial friendly against Bhutan. He came on as a 64th minute for Rowllin Borges as India won 3–0.

Career statistics

Club

International

Honours

India
 SAFF Championship runner-up: 2018
 King's Cup third place: 2019

India U23
 South Asian Games Silver medal: 2016

References

External links 
 Indian Super League Profile

1997 births
Living people
People from Dibrugarh district
Footballers from Assam
Indian Gorkhas
Indian footballers
Dempo SC players
Kerala Blasters FC players
RoundGlass Punjab FC players
Association football midfielders
I-League players
I-League 2nd Division players
Indian Super League players
India youth international footballers
2019 AFC Asian Cup players
India international footballers
Odisha FC players
Mumbai City FC players
South Asian Games silver medalists for India
South Asian Games medalists in football